Gunning railway station is a heritage-listed railway station located on the Main South line in the Upper Lachlan Shire of New South Wales, Australia. It serves the town of Gunning. It is also known as Gunning Railway Station and yard group. The property was added to the New South Wales State Heritage Register on 2 April 1999.

History
The line from Goulburn to Yass was contracted to be completed by 31 December 1875 however, "as soon as the line was sufficiently advanced, arrangements could be made to open it to Gunning". As a result, Gunning station officially opened on 9 November 1875 (however, freight traffic commenced operations on 2 November 1875 ) when the Main South line was extended from Goulburn. Gunning appeared in the timetable published on 20 January 1876 with a twice-daily service. The journey time (from Sydney) was a little over 8 hours.

Gunning served as the terminus until the line was extended to Bowning on 3 July 1876. A second platform was added in 1913 when the line was duplicated.

Services
Gunning is served by one daily NSW TrainLink XPT service in each direction operating between Sydney and Melbourne, and a twice weekly NSW TrainLink Xplorer between Griffith and  Sydney split from Canberrra services at Goulburn. This station is a request stop, so the train stops only if passengers booked to board/alight here. The evening Melbourne XPT services pass through this station without stopping.

Description 
The complex comprises a series of station buildings including a type 4, standard roadside station, erected in 1875; a type 11, station building, duplication, erected in 1913; a type 3 signal box, with a timber skillion roof building on platform, completed in 1913; an out shed, completed in 1913; and a per way shed of corrugated galvanised iron, that is no longer extant. Other structures include brick platform faces, erected in 1875 and 1915; and a dock platform. Artefacts include closing keys for signal frame, (AA08), signal box - the signal box was decommissioned (prior to 2004, date unknown).

Heritage listing 
Gunning station group is one of the best surviving examples of a small late Victorian country station complex with elements from the opening of the line in 1875 (when it was terminus for a year) through to 1913 when the last building on the site was added. It clearly demonstrates the changes from single track to double track operation in 1915 with addition of a second platform and more complex signalling arrangements. It exhibits a confidence in railway building and its importance in the development of the country by the scale of the buildings, particularly the station masters residence. It presents as a reasonably intact site with all of the major elements still evident. The original station building was an early proto-type of standardised design in station buildings.

The Gunning railway station was listed on the New South Wales State Heritage Register on 2 April 1999 having satisfied the following criteria.

The place possesses uncommon, rare or endangered aspects of the cultural or natural history of New South Wales.

This item is assessed as historically rare. This item is assessed as scientifically rare. This item is assessed as arch. rare. This item is assessed as socially rare.

See also

References

Attribution

External links

Easy Access railway stations in New South Wales
John Whitton railway stations
Railway stations in Australia opened in 1875
Regional railway stations in New South Wales
New South Wales State Heritage Register
Gunning, New South Wales
Articles incorporating text from the New South Wales State Heritage Register
Main Southern railway line, New South Wales